Chaco tucumana is a species of mygalomorph spiders of Argentina, named after its type locality: Tucumán. This species differs from C. obscura in the shorter male embolus and the shorter female spermathecal ducts. From other species of the genus it differs in its dark uniform color, the flexible anterior female tarsi, the denser scopulae on the posterior tarsi, and the female spermathecae without a basal protuberance. As in C. obscura, smaller specimens are much lighter in color, and it has darker spots that are evident on the sides of its cephalic region, the apex of femora, base of the patellae and lateral tibiae and dorsal abdomen. Larger specimens are much darker, almost black, with no visible pattern.

Description
The labium possesses one cuspule. A serrula is present. The sternal sigilla is medium-sized, oval, and submarginal. Chelicerae: the rastellum is as in the female; the inner margin has seven teeth. The cheliceral tumescence is flat, covered with thin setae on its inferior half. The cephalothorax, legs, and palpi are blackish-brown; the abdomen is brown with light-brown spots.

Its cephalic region is convex, while the fovea is slightly procurved, almost straight. The labium has two cuspules. A serrula is absent. The sternal sigilla is small, submarginal, and of medium depth; the sternum is rebordered. The rastellum is as in C. obscura. The colour is the same as in the male.

Distribution and behaviour
The animals construct burrows with a door, or sometimes two.

Most of the specimens were collected at the foot of almost vertical banks or the foot of large trees in Tucuman and Catamarca. Juveniles found elsewhere might extend this apparent habitat distribution.

See also
Spider anatomy
List of Nemesiidae species

References

Further reading
Study on a Mygalomorph spider community in central Argentina:

External links
ADW entry

Nemesiidae
Spiders of Argentina
Spiders described in 1995